Events from the 1220s in the Kingdom of Scotland.

Monarch 

 Alexander II, 1214–1249

Events 
 21 June 1221 – the wedding of Alexander II of Scotland and Joan of England.
 1224 – Elgin Cathedral is founded and dedicated in Moray.
 1229 – Balmerino Abbey is established by Ermengarde de Beaumont and Alexander II of Scotland.

Births

Deaths 

 11 September 1222 – Adam of Melrose, abbot and bishop
Full date unknown
 c. 1221 – Ada, Countess of Atholl (died 1266)
 c. 1222 – Walter Olifard
 1223 – Gille Brigte, Earl of Strathearn (born 1150)
 c. 1226 – William de Moravia of Petty

See also 

 List of years in Scotland
 Timeline of Scottish history

References 

1220s